Holovanivsk is an urban-type settlement, and is the administrative center of Holovanivsk Raion in the west of Kirovohrad Oblast. It hosts the administration of Holovanivsk settlement hromada, one of the hromadas of Ukraine. Population:

History 
It was a village in the Baltsky Uyezd of the Podolian Governorate of the Russian Empire.

A local newspaper is published here since March 1932.

Also spelled Golovanevsk, the village was a shtetl home to thousands of Jews through the 1930s. Often targeted by pogroms, Jewish residents organized a self-defense militia after an incident on December 18, 1917, in which the Jewish stands of the town marketplace were looted and nine pogromists and civilians were killed in the ethnic violence that followed.

The Jewish self-defense unit was defeated by White Army forces commanded by Yakov Slashchov on August 4, 1919 when Slashchov’s forces killed 200 Jews in Golovanevsk as retaliation for the militia’s armed opposition. In February 1920, retreating White Army forces under Anton Denikin killed 50 Jews at Golovanevsk.

During World War II the village was under Nazi German occupation, the Jewish population of the village largely exterminated in two major operations in late September 1941 and February 1942. The town was liberated the Red Army on March 17, 1944. A local public garden on the grounds of the Museum of the History of Golovaniv District contains a mass grave of Jewish remains with a memorial inscribed: “The shooting place of residents of Golovanevsk village.”

In January 1989 the population was 7066 people.

In January 2013 the population was 6133 people.

References

Urban-type settlements in Holovanivsk Raion
Cities of district significance in Ukraine
Baltsky Uyezd